Jinty can refer to:

 Jinty (comics), a British comic published 1974–1981
 Jinty Caenepeel (born 1996), Belgian footballer
 Jinty Nelson (born 1942), British historian

 A nickname for the LMS Fowler Class 3F steam locomotive
 Jinty, a Fowler 3F that appeared in one of The Railway Series books